Taphrina coryli is an ascomycete fungus that is a plant pathogen.

References

Fungal plant pathogens and diseases
Taphrinomycetes
Fungi described in 1911